Derek Mandell (born September 18, 1986, in Tamuning, Guam) is a Guamanian middle-distance runner. He took part in the 2008 Oceania Athletics Championships, winning bronze, and 2008 Summer Olympics, where he broke a personal men's 800m record even though Mandell was eliminated in the first round.

He later competed in the 2010 Guam Athletics Championships, where he won two gold medals, the 2011 Pacific Games, where he won a silver medal, and the 2011 World Championships in Athletics, where he set a personal best time of 1:57.11.

He also competed in the men's 800m event at the 2012 Summer Olympics but was again eliminated in the first round.

Biography

Early life and education
Derek Mandell was an athlete at University of Portland. Mandell joined the team as a walk-on.

Olympic career 
Mandell qualified for the 2012 Summer Olympics in the 800 m middle-distance run with a universality placement.

Achievements

References

External links
 
 

Living people
Olympic track and field athletes of Guam
Athletes (track and field) at the 2008 Summer Olympics
Athletes (track and field) at the 2012 Summer Olympics
People from Tamuning, Guam
1986 births
Guamanian male middle-distance runners